Arikesarin was Shilahara ruler of north Konkan branch from 1015 CE – 1022 CE.

Vajjada was succeeded by his younger brother Arikesarin alias Keshideva I. While yet a prince, he had taken part in the Paramara king Sindhuraja's campaign in South Kosala (Chhattisgadh) and had also marched with an army to Saurashtra where he worshipped Someshvara (Somanatha) after his conquests.

It was during the reign of Arikesarin that Konkan was invaded by the Paramara  king Bhoja. Two of his grants made in celebration of the victory are dated in A. D. 1020, one in January and the other in September of the year. (Dept. Gazetteer: 2002)

See also
 Shilahara

References
 Bhandarkar R.G. (1957): Early History of Deccan, Sushil Gupta (I) Pvt Ltd, Calcutta.
 Fleet J.F. (1896): The Dynasties of the Kanarese District of The Bombay Presidency, Written for the Bombay Gazetteer.
 Department of Gazetteer, Govt of Maharashtra (2002): Itihaas : Prachin Kal, Khand -1 (Marathi)
 Department of Gazetteer, Govt of Maharashtra (1960): Kolhapur District Gazetteer
 Department of Gazetteer, Govt of Maharashtra (1964): Kolaba District Gazetteer
 Department of Gazetteer, Govt of Maharashtra (1982): Thane District Gazetteer
 A.S.Altekar (1936): The Silaharas of Western India

External links
 Silver Coin of Shilaharas of Southern Maharashtra (Coinex 2006 - Souvenir) (Archived 2009-10-25)

Shilahara dynasty
11th-century rulers in Asia
1022 deaths
Year of birth unknown